Siobhan Finneran is an English actress who has worked in theatre, television, and film. Finneran made her film debut starring as Rita in the 1987 film release Rita, Sue and Bob Too. Over the following decade, Finneran established herself as a television actress appearing frequently in both comedic and dramatic guest roles. Into the 21st century, Finneran began appearing in more regular and leading roles in returning and standalone television series. Her more prolific work includes Benidorm (2007–2015), Downton Abbey (2010–2012) and Happy Valley (2014–present).

Finneran has appeared in several additional independent films, most notably in The Selfish Giant (2013) which earned her a British Independent Film Award nomination. She has also appeared in several theatre productions — including the original production of On the Shore of the Wide World (2005) at the Royal Exchange, Manchester.

Film

Television

Theatre credits

References

External links 
 
 Siobhan Finneran CV at Curtis Brown Talent Agency

Actress filmographies
British filmographies